The Rt. Rev. Jeffrey William Mello is an American Episcopal clergyman who has served as 16th Bishop of Connecticut since 2022.

Early life and education
Born and raised in Cranston, Rhode Island, Mello obtained a Bachelor's degree from Rhode Island College in 1991 and a Master's degree in social work from Simmons University in Boston, Massachusetts, in 2000. After working as a clinical social worker in the addiction psychiatry unit of Massachusetts General Hospital for several years, he studied for a master's degree in divinity at Episcopal Divinity School in Cambridge, Massachusetts, which he was awarded in 2007.

Career
Mello was ordained a deacon on June 2, 2007, and a priest on January 12, 2008. After serving as associate rector of Christ Church, Cambridge, for two years, he was appointed rector of St. Paul's Church in Brookline, Massachusetts, in 2009. From 2008 to 2017 he was also an adjunct professor at Episcopal Divinity School.

In May 2022 Mello was elected Bishop of Connecticut and consecrated on 15 October 2022.

Family
Mello's husband, Paul, is the founder and artistic director of a theater company in Boston and teaches at the Boston Conservatory at Berklee College of Music. They have one son.

References

Living people
People from Cranston, Rhode Island
Rhode Island College alumni
Simmons University alumni
Episcopal bishops of Connecticut
Year of birth missing (living people)